The 1965–66 Algerian Championnat National was the fourth season of the Algerian Championnat National since its establishment in 1962. A total of 16 teams contested the league, with CR Belcourt as the defending champions.

Team summaries

Promotion and relegation 
Teams promoted from Algerian Division 2 1965-1966 
 No Promotion

Teams relegated to Algerian Division 2 1966-1967

 MSP Batna
 JSM Skikda
 USM Sétif
 ES Mostaganem

League table

Season statistics

Top scorers

Hat-tricks

Note
4 Player scored 4 goals

References

Algerian Ligue Professionnelle 1 seasons
1965–66 in Algerian football
Algeria